Jeffery Adrian Priestley Marston (15 December 1927 - 7 April 2016) was a surgeon and medical academic. the academic dean of the Royal Society of Medicine and the president of the society's History of Medicine Society for 2007/08.

His maternal great grandfather was Jeffery Allen Marston, principal medical officer to the Indian Army.

See also
 List of presidents of the History of Medicine Society

References 

Presidents of the History of Medicine Society
1927 births
2016 deaths
20th-century English medical doctors

Fellows of the Royal College of Surgeons
British surgeons